Stanisław Gomułka (born 10 September 1940, Krężoły, Świętokrzyskie Voivodeship) is a Polish  born economist, from 1970  up to 2005 a reader in Economics at the London School of Economics,  a visiting professor  or research fellow at several US universities (Pennsylvania, Stanford, Columbia and Harvard), also at Aarhus university,  Netherlands Institute for Advanced Studies and the Central European university, in the years 1989-2002 advisor to the Ministry of Finance and National Bank of Poland, from 2013 a member of the Polish Academy of Sciences. He received the Order of Polonia Restituta in 2014.

His research interests are in the fields of endogenous economic growth; economics of technological change; comparative economic systems; reforms and post-communist transition, especially Poland and the former USSR;  trade and financial relations between East and West; privatisation and analysis of the behaviour of enterprises in Central Europe, the former USSR and China.

See also 
 János Kornai
 Grzegorz Kołodko
 Leszek Balcerowicz

References

External links 
 Interview in Polish, Radio ZET

1940 births
Academics of the London School of Economics
Living people
Polish economists